The 43rd Infantry Brigade was a brigade of the British Army during the First and Second World Wars, and later, as 43 (Wessex) Brigade, a regional headquarters from 1985 to 2014.

First World War
The brigade was created during the First World War as part of the 14th (Light) Division, part of Kitchener's Army.

Order of Battle
 6th (Service) Battalion, Somerset Light Infantry (left June 1918)
 6th (Service) Battalion, Duke of Cornwall's Light Infantry (disbanded February 1918)
 6th (Service) Battalion, King's Own Yorkshire Light Infantry (disbanded February 1918)
 10th (Service) Battalion, Durham Light Infantry (disbanded February 1918)
 43rd Machine Gun Company, Machine Gun Corps (formed 16 February 1916, moved to 16th Battalion, Machine Gun Corps 1 March 1918)
 43rd Trench Mortar Battery (formed 24 April 1916)

Second World War
It was reformed in Britain on 16 August 1943, for Lines of Communication security force duties in North Africa during the Second World War. Landing in North Africa on 23 September 1943, it was redesignated on 9 November 1943 as the '40th Infantry Division' for deception purposes, after moving to Sicily.

Order of Battle
 31st Battalion, Suffolk Regiment (19 August 1943 to 27 October 1943)
 30th Battalion, Cheshire Regiment (19 August 1943 to 5 November 1943) 
 30th Battalion, Dorset Regiment (19 August 1943 to 16 June 1944, "120th Infantry Brigade" from 9 November 1943)
 30th Battalion, Somerset Light Infantry (26 September 1943 to 12 April 1944, "119th Infantry brigade" from 9 November 1943)
 30th Battalion, Green Howards (26 September 1943 to 27 October 1943)
 30th Battalion, Royal Norfolk Regiment (21 October 1943 to 19 May 1944, "121st Infantry Brigade" from 9 November 1943)

The battalions "were given brigade designations; and every effort was made to appear to be a division. This included the adoption of a divisional sign featuring the diamond and acorn [based on] the Great War 40th Division; these were made up locally and worn on uniform by the personnel of the 'division' – in reality, three battalions of low medical category men armed with personal weapons only and with a skeleton complement of transport." (Chappell, p. 23)

The brigade was disbanded, still in Sicily, on 30 June 1944.

Post war

Cold War 
In 1985 the 43rd (Wessex) Brigade was formed as one of the new one-star Headquarters, principally as a National Defence Brigade commanding the Territorial Army in the south west of England, part of South West District.

The Brigade assisted with recruiting and public relations in its area, which encompassed Bristol, Cornwall, Devon, Dorset, Gloucestershire, Somerset, Wiltshire, the Channel Islands and Isles of Scilly. Its responsibilities included the annual Ten Tors walking challenge on Dartmoor.
43rd (Wessex) Infantry Brigade (0199)
 Brigade Headquarters, at Wyvern Barracks, Exeter
 Royal Wessex Yeomanry (V), in Cirencester (Home Defence (Reconnaissance))
 Royal Gloucestershire Hussars Band of the Royal Wessex Yeomanry (V)
 2nd Battalion, The Royal Regiment of Fusiliers, at Picton Barracks, Bulford Camp (Mechanised Infantry (Wheeled))
 4th (Volunteer) Battalion (1st Rifle Volunteers), The Devonshire and Dorset Regiment (V), HQ at Wyvern Barracks, Exeter (Light Infantry, Home Defence) – formed in 1987
 Devonshire Band of the Devonshire and Dorset Regiment (V), in Taunton
 6th (Somerset and Cornwall) Battalion, The Light Infantry (V), in Bath
 1st Battalion (Rifle Volunteers), Wessex Regiment (V), in Devizes (Light Infantry)
 The Hampshire and Dorset Band of the Wessex Regiment (V)
 266 (Gloucestershire Volunteer Artillery) Observation Post Battery, Royal Artillery (V), in Bristol (to 7th Parachute Regiment, RHA and 47th Field Regiment, RA) (18 x L118 105mm light guns)
 155th (Wessex) Transport Regiment, Royal Corps of Transport (V), in Taunton
 211th (Wessex) Field Hospital, Royal Army Medical Corps (V), in Plymouth (Field Hospital )
 219th (Wessex) Field Hospital, Royal Army Medical Corps (V), in Keynsham, Bristol (Field Hospital )

Modern day 
In 1995 the restructuring programme within the British Army saw an increase in the brigade's responsibility to include regional and budgetary aspects working to a new superior headquarters: 3rd Division.  The Strategic Defence Review of 1998 further increased the brigade's responsibility and as from 1 April 1999 it came under the command of Headquarters 4th Division, and moved from Exeter to Bulford Camp in September 1999 to establish the new Headquarters 43rd (Wessex) Brigade.
 Royal Wessex Yeomanry
 The Rifle Volunteers
 Exeter University Officer Training Corps (UOTC)
 Bristol University Officer Training Corps (UOTC)
 Affiliated Commander for ACF and CCF in the South West of England

The 43 (Wessex) Brigade was transferred to 4th Division on 1 April 2007, and then came under Support Command in late 2011.

The brigade was disbanded at Jellalabad Barracks, Tidworth, in December 2014 under the Army 2020 plan. Units and personnel from the brigade merged with Royal Artillery regiments to form 1st Artillery Brigade and Headquarters South West.

Order of Battle on disbandment
The Royal Wessex Yeomanry (RHQ Bovington) (TA)
6th Battalion The Rifles (HQ Exeter) (TA)
155 (Wessex) Transport Regiment (HQ Plymouth) (TA)
Bristol University Officers Training Corps (HQ Bristol) (TA)
Exeter University Officers Training Corps (HQ Exeter) (TA)
243 Field Hospital (Wessex) (RHQ Keynsham) (TA)

References

43
Military units and formations established in 1914
1914 establishments in the United Kingdom
2014 disestablishments in the United Kingdom
Infantry brigades of the British Army in World War I